Alcalá de la Vega is a municipality in Cuenca, Castile-La Mancha, Spain. It had a population of 90 as of 2020.

References

External links

Municipalities in the Province of Cuenca